35 Engineer Regiment is a unit of the British Army's Royal Engineers under operational command (OPCOM) 8th Engineer Brigade, Force Troops Command. The Unit provided close support engineering under operational control (OPCON) to 20th Armoured Infantry Brigade. It is now an Explosive Ordnance Disposal and Search unit. It is located in Wimbish.

Organization 
Today the regiment consists of:

 35 Engineer Regiment, in Wimbish
 15 Field Squadron
 17 Field Squadron
 21 Field Squadron

Army 2020 Refine

As part of Army 2020 Refine, a written statement in December 2016 stated that the Unit would be rationalised, with all manpower being redeployed to other areas of the British Army. The Unit would return from Germany and re-role as an EOD and Search Regiment; 29 and 37 AES would move to 21 and 32 Engineer Regiment respectively as part of this re-role. 35 Engineer Regiment would be an Explosive Ordnance and Search Regiment at Carver Barracks, Wimbish.

References

Regiments of the Royal Engineers
Explosive ordnance disposal units and formations